Mahavelona can stand for:
 Mahavelona, Ankazobe - a commune in Analamanga, Madagascar.
 Mahavelona, Soavinandriana - a commune in Itasy, Madagascar.
 Mahavelona - also called: Foulpointe.  A commune in Atsinanana, Madagascar